Derry is a town in Rockingham County, New Hampshire, United States. The population was 34,317 at the 2020 census. Although it is a town and not a city, Derry is the most populous community in Rockingham County and the fourth most populous in the state. The town's nickname, "Spacetown", derives from the fact that Derry is the birthplace of Alan Shepard, the first astronaut from the United States in space. Derry was also for a time the home of the poet Robert Frost and his family.

The Derry census-designated place, with a 2020 population of 22,879, occupies the central part of the town, extending from Derry's downtown in the west to the town of Hampstead in the east. The town also includes the village of East Derry.

History 
The area was first settled by Scots-Irish families in 1719 as part of the town of Londonderry, as were present-day Windham and portions of Manchester, Salem and Hudson. The town of Derry was formed in 1827 from the eastern portion of Londonderry and was named, like Londonderry, after the city of Derry in Ireland, the Irish word Doire meaning "oak grove". The first potato planted in the United States was sown in Derry in the town's common field in 1719. The town is the location of two of America's oldest private schools, Pinkerton Academy, founded in 1814 and still in operation, and the closed Adams Female Seminary.

Derry was once a linen and leather-making center until New England textile industries moved south in the 20th century. As recently as World War II, Derry was also a sleepy farming community. From 1900 to 1911, poet Robert Frost lived with his family on a farm in Derry purchased for him by his grandfather. The Robert Frost Farm is now a National Historic Landmark and state park and is open to the public for tours, poetry readings and other cultural events from spring through fall.

The post-war suburban boom, the town's proximity to Boston in the south and Manchester to the northwest, and the construction of Interstate 93 through town led to a huge population boom. After the 1990s, this growth disappeared, with the population remaining essentially unchanged since 2000.

The Manchester and Lawrence branch of the Boston and Maine Railroad ran through Derry, but is now abandoned, with most of the line in town now a rail trail. The New Hampshire Department of Transportation stated in its I-93 corridor transit study and its 2012 statewide rail plan that it could be feasible to reopen the line.

Historical postcards

Geography
Derry is in southern New Hampshire, in southwestern Rockingham County. The town is crossed by Interstate 93 and New Hampshire routes 28, 28 Bypass, and 102.

Derry is drained by Beaver Brook, a south-flowing tributary of the Merrimack River. Island Pond is on the southeast border of the town and drains to the Spicket River, another tributary of the Merrimack. A small section along the northern border of town drains north to the Exeter River, part of the Piscataqua River watershed.

Both areas are part of the Derry census-designated place.

Adjacent municipalities
 Chester, New Hampshire (north)
 Sandown, New Hampshire (northeast)
 Hampstead, New Hampshire (east)
 Atkinson, New Hampshire (southeast)
 Salem, New Hampshire (southeast)
 Windham, New Hampshire (south)
 Londonderry, New Hampshire (west)
 Auburn, New Hampshire (northwest)

Climate
Derry has a four-season humid continental climate (Köppen Dfa), with long, cold, snowy winters, and very warm and somewhat humid summers; spring and fall in between are crisp and relatively brief transitions. Precipitation is well-spread throughout the year, including snowfall in the winter.

Demographics

As of the census of 2020, there were 34,317 people residing in the town. The racial makeup of the town was 88.1% White, 2.3% African American, 1.8% American Indian and Alaska Native, 2.3% Asian, 0.1% Pacific Islander, 0.9% some other race, and 1.7% from two or more races. 4.6% of the population were Hispanic or Latino of any race.

As of the census of 2010, there were 12,537 households, out of which 35.0% had children under the age of 18 living with them, 52.4% had a married couple living together, 12.2% had a woman whose husband does not live with her, and 30.1% were non-families. 23.0% of all households were made up of individuals, and 6.4% had someone living alone who was 65 years of age or older. The average household size was 2.62, and the average family size was 3.10.

In the town, the population was spread out, with 24.7% under the age of 18, 9.3% from 18 to 24, 27.0% from 25 to 44, 30.4% from 45 to 64, and 8.7% who were 65 years of age or older. The median age was 38.2 years. For every 100 females, there were 98.6 males. For every 100 females age 18 and over, there were 95.9 males.

At the 2000 census the median income for a household in the town was $54,634, and the median income for a family was $61,625. Males had a median income of $41,271 versus $30,108 for females. The per capita income for the town was $22,315. 4.6% of the population and 3.3% of families were below the poverty line. Out of the total people living in poverty, 5.0% were under the age of 18 and 7.1% were 65 or older.

Government

In the New Hampshire Senate, Derry is in the 19th District and is currently represented by Republican Regina Birdsell. On the Executive Council of New Hampshire, Derry is in District 3 and is currently represented by Republican Janet Stevens. In the U.S. House of Representatives, Derry is included in New Hampshire's 1st congressional district and is currently represented by Democrat Chris Pappas.

Derry is part of a reliably Republican belt of dense, populous towns along Interstate 93 near the Massachusetts border. Derry leans Republican in presidential elections, and has even trended rightwards as of late. Bill Clinton did manage to carry the town with a plurality of the vote in 1996. No Democrat has won a majority of Derry’s voters since Lyndon B. Johnson’s landslide election in 1964.

Economy

Top employers

According to the town's 2020 Comprehensive Annual Financial Report, the top employers in the town are the following:

Transportation 
Five New Hampshire state highways and one Interstate Highway cross the town of Derry:

NH 28 enters from Salem in the south, follows Rockingham Road north to the southern limit of the town's main business district, then turns west along with Rockingham Road toward an intersection with Windham Road and Kendall Pond Road (Shute's Corner), and then north to follow Birch Street. After crossing NH 102, it becomes Crystal Avenue, and finally at Tsienneto Road changes names again to Manchester Road before entering Londonderry in the western part of town.
NH 28 Bypass, known locally as "The Bypass", begins at South Main Street where NH 28 turns along with Rockingham Road, and continues on South Main Street, North Main Street, and Londonderry Turnpike before crossing the extreme northwestern corner of town and entering Auburn.
NH 102 enters in the west from Londonderry, where it is known locally as Broadway. Running southwest to northeast, it crosses North and South Main Street (NH 28 Bypass) and East Derry Road at a traffic circle in the center of town (Danforth Circle), from where it follows Chester Road to the northern border with the town of Chester.
NH 111 crosses the extreme southeastern corner of town, entering from Salem in the south, and passing into Atkinson in the east. There is only one intersection in the town, with Island Pond Road, with NH 111 spending less than 1/2 mile in Derry.
NH 121 crosses the extreme northeastern corner of town for a few hundred feet between Hampstead and Sandown. There are no intersections on this stretch of NH 121 that connect to the rest of Derry, though Hampstead Road intersects NH 121 a few feet from the Derry border with Hampstead some distance to the south.
Interstate 93 crosses the southwestern corner of Derry, for less than 1 mile. There are no interchanges in the town, but the interchange with NH 102 in Londonderry is less than 1,000 feet from the town line.

The nearest air transport is Manchester–Boston Regional Airport. There is currently no passenger rail service in Derry, though a former train depot in the center of town has been converted to a hub for the main commercial district in town. Amtrak provides Downeaster service and the MBTA' Haverhill Line at Haverhill station, 32 miles to the southeast.

Education

Public schools
 Administration:
 Derry Cooperative School District
 Elementary:
 Ernest P. Barka Elementary School
 Derry Village School
 East Derry Memorial Elementary School
 Grinnell Elementary School
 South Range Elementary School
 Middle:
 Gilbert H. Hood Middle School
 West Running Brook Middle School

Private schools

 Pinkerton Academy, serving as the public high school for Derry, Chester, Hampstead, Auburn, Hooksett, and Candia
 Nutfield Cooperative School (pre-school and kindergarten)
 Saint Thomas Aquinas School (pre-kindergarten through grade 8)
 Derry Montessori School (age 3 through grade 3)
 Calvary Christian School operated from 1970 to 2009 and educated an average of 400 students in grades K–12.
Next Charter School (grades 9 through 12)

Media
Derry is home to two media sources, the weekly Derry News, which is owned by The Eagle-Tribune and television station WWJE-DT, owned by Univision Communications. Derry is located within the Boston television market and the Manchester radio market. Derry Community Television, also known as DerryCAM, is the town's public-access television station on local cable TV.

The weekly Nutfield News, which was locally owned by Nutfield Publishing, was published until December 2022.

Notable people 

 Samantha Brown (born 1970), former host of Travel Channel, seller on QVC
 Caleb Chapman (born 1973), musician
 Charles Cogswell Doe (1830–1896), Chief Justice of the Supreme Court of New Hampshire, born in Derry
 Tricia Dunn-Luoma (born 1974), hockey player; Olympic gold medalist
 Charles Miller Floyd (1861–1923), 51st governor of New Hampshire 
 Robert Frost (1874–1963), four-time Pulitzer Prize-winning poet (to date, the only poet to achieve this feat)
 Brendan James (born 1979), singer-songwriter, pianist
 Priscilla Lane (1915–1995), actress
 David Nelson (born 1974), world-record-holding video game competitor
 William Patterson (1789–1838), U.S. congressman
 Joe Seiders (born 1980), musician
 Alan B. Shepard Jr. (1923–1998), astronaut, first American in space, and as a member of Apollo 14 one of 12 people to have walked on the Moon
 Pamela Smart (born 1967), convicted conspirator to murder
 John Stark (1728–1822), Continental Army major general in the Revolutionary War
 Aaron Fletcher Stevens (1819–1887), brigadier general, U.S. congressman
 Matt Taven (born 1985), professional wrestler
 Paul Thompson (born 1988), hockey player
 Matthew Thornton (1714–1803), Irish-born Founding Father of the United States who signed the United States Declaration of Independence as a representative of New Hampshire
 Nikki Tilroe (1941–2005), performer, puppeteer
 Ryan Tuerck (born 1985), Formula D Drift professional driver

Sites of interest
 Adams Memorial Building
 Derry Historical Society and Museum 
 Robert Frost Farm, National Historic Landmark 
 Taylor Mill State Historic Site
 Rockingham Recreational Trail, rail trail to Fremont

Sister cities

  Cherepovets, Vologda Oblast, Russia

References

Further reading
 Richard Holmes, Town Historian, "Town of Derry"
 Rev. Edward L. Parker, History of Londonderry, Comprising the Towns of Derry and Londonderry; Perkins & Whipple; Boston 1851
 A. J. Coolidge & J. B. Mansfield, A History and Description of New England; Boston 1859

External links

 
 Derry Public Library
 Derry News, covering Derry and Londonderry
 Nutfield News
 Derry Community Access Media
 New Hampshire Economic and Labor Market Information Bureau Profile

 
Scotch-Irish American culture in New Hampshire
Towns in Rockingham County, New Hampshire
Towns in New Hampshire